The School Gyrls (briefly known as Forever) were an American girl group formed in 2008. They were signed to Nick Cannon's NCredible Entertainment. The group starred in an eponymous movie that premiered on Nickelodeon on February 21, 2010. The group's self-titled debut album was released on March 23, 2010. The album peaked at number 118 on the Billboard 200 albums chart, and was preceded by the singles "Something Like a Party" and "Get Like Me". After the commercial success of their film and their single "Something Like A Party", the group released another movie called "A Very School Gyrls Holla-Day", which was followed with a second studio album of the same name. Shortly after this, two of the group's original members Mandy Rain and Jacque Pyles, decided to leave to pursue solo careers. They were replaced by Brittany Oaks and Natalie Aguero.

After all the line up changes, the group decided to change their name to "Forever" (stylized as FOREVER) to reflect members' more mature appearance. Following the name change, remaining members Rae Bello, Sade Austin, and Monica Parales left as well, and the group disbanded.

History

2008–10: Formation and School Gyrls

Nick Cannon was first introduced to Mandy Rain on the set of his reality show Star Camp, where she was the youngest member of the Star Camp group "The Giggle Club". After Star Camp wrapped, Cannon considered a solo career for Mandy, but decided instead to use her as the nucleus of a girl group; he also formulated a movie concept about three private school girls who meet in detention, based on "Detention", a song Mandy had already recorded which later appeared on their debut album.

Cannon brought in Monica Anne Parales, who had auditioned for "The Giggle Club", but she wound up working on the "Jam-X Kids" project instead. Jasmine Villegas was the original third member of the group, but she left early on to pursue a solo career. After Jasmine's departure, Jacque Rae Pyles was chosen and added to the group.

The School Gyrls made their television debut with Nick Cannon on the season finale of E! television series Party Monsters Cabo in January 2009. The group's first CD was released under the Island Def Jam imprint. They opened for Korean-pop acts the Wonder Girls and 2PM at the House of Blues in West Hollywood, California, on June 11, 2010.

The film, also called School Gyrls, written and directed by Cannon, premiered in February 2010. It centers around three teen girls and their lives in high school, and features cameos from Reverend Run, Vanessa Simmons, Justin Bieber, Kristinia DeBarge, Soulja Boy, Mathias Anderle, Diggy Simmons, and others.

A Very School Gyrls Holla-Day premiered on Nickelodeon on December 4, 2010. A couple of weeks ahead of filming the holiday movie, Cannon announced he was adding two new girls to the group, (then) 15-year-old Sade Austin, and 18-year-old Lauren Chavez were chosen to be in the group. They also recorded a new Christmas album, A Very School Gyrls Holla Day, released in December, and a single, "Going to the Mall".

2011–12: Line-up and name changes, Wonder Girls movie, and eventual demise of the group

Shortly after the second movie release, Mandy Rain and Jacque Pyles decided to leave the School Gyrls to pursue solo careers. After their departure In 2011, Natalie Aguero and Brittany Oaks were added to the group to replace them. The first appearance with the two new members was at Kids Choice Awards 2011. But shortly after starting a new song with the group, Oaks left the group to pursue a career in a girl group named DollFace with her older sister Breanne Oaks.

After hearing about Briana "Rae" Bello from close friends of her she was brought into the studio and she was added to the group. The world was first introduced to Rae on September 9, 2011, when the Gyrls performed at Crenshaw Plaza, performing their new song, "Pump Ya Breaks", for the back-to-school bash in L.A.

In late 2011, the School Gyrls announced that they were coming out in a third  movie called The Wonder Girls starring the Korean pop girl group Wonder Girls on February 2, 2012 the movie premiered on TeenNick with their song "The DJ is Mine" featuring the School Gyrls. In late 2012 the girls were interviewed at the "Beyond the Bells" event and the Gyrls confirmed that their third album will be released sometime in late 2012 or 2013. The album was planned to contain songs "The Power Goes Out" and "We Just Got It All" which were featured in the 2012 movie.

On July 20, 2012, after the Gyrls performance at Knotts Berry Farm Amusement Park, the group's Twitter account announced that the group would have the new name FOREVER to reflect their advancing age. Member Rae publicly left the group for a solo career, leaving only four members: Natalie, Monica, Lauren, and Sade.

Unsurprisingly, on September 5, 2012, Sade announced that she too was abandoning the failing venture, stating that she wished the remaining "Gyrls" well. Only four days earlier, the group had shot their first music video as FOREVER, for their single "Can't Stop This Night." Awkwardly, Sade thus appears in that video with management hastily retitling the artist card for the video as "Forever featuring Sade." By November 14, Monica had also had her fill and announced that she was quitting the group, which left the group without a critical mass of talent and no other option but to disband permanently.

Changing Line-up

Members
 Mandy Rain – vocals
 Monica Parales – vocals
 Jacque Pyles – vocals, raps
 Natalie Aguero – vocals
 Lauren Chavez – vocals
 Brittany Oaks – vocals
 Sade Austin – vocals, raps
 Rae Bello – vocals
 Jasmine Villegas - vocals

Timeline

 Brittany Oaks is excluded from the timeline because she was only briefly part of the group.

Discography

 School Gyrls (2010)
 A Very School Gyrls Holla-Day (2010)

Filmography
School Gyrls (2010)
A Very School Gyrls Holla-Day (2010)
The Wonder Girls (2012)

References

External links

 Forever on Facebook
 Forever on Twitter

Musical groups from California
American pop music groups
Musical groups disestablished in 2012
Musical groups established in 2008
American pop girl groups
Island Records artists